Five Days, Five Nights is a 1961 joint Soviet–East German film, directed by Lev Arnshtam and Heinz Thiel.

Plot
On 8 May 1945, the day of Germany's surrender at the end of World War II, exiled communist Erich Braun returns along with the Red Army to his native city of Dresden, only three months after it was devastated in aerial bombardment. He aids a group of Soviet soldiers to recover the art of the Old Masters Picture Gallery from the ruins of the Zwinger Palace. During the next five days, while searching for the collection, he encounters several of the city's residents who have also returned from the war. Although they distrust the Soviets at first, they eventually assist them to recover the pictures.

Cast
 Wilhelm Koch-Hooge as Erich Braun
 Annekathrin Bürger as Katrin
 Erich Franz as Father Baum
 Heinz-Dieter Knaup as Paul Naumann
 Evgenia Kozireva as Nikitina
 Marga Legal as Luise Ramk
 Mikhail Mayorov as General
 Vladimir Pitsek as Galkin
 Nikolai Pogodin as Rudakov
 Vsevolod Safonov as Captain Leonov
 Vsevolod Sanaev as Sergeant Kozlov
 Raimund Schelcher as farmer
 Gennadi Yukhtin as Strokov

Production
The picture's plot was inspired by the recovery of the art of the Old Masters Picture Gallery through the hands of Soviet troops in 1945. The art collection was then taken to the USSR, where it was kept until being returned to the Dresden Gallery during 1960. The film was the first Soviet–East German co-production in the field of cinema.

Reception 
Five Days, Five Nights sold more than two million tickets in the German Democratic Republic.

The film critic of Der Spiegel described the picture as "making no claim to document history truthfully", while also quoting Walter Ulbricht, who called it "a great work of the Working Class" and a monument to Soviet–East German friendship. The Die Zeit reviewer wrote: "the film portrays the Germans quite objectively. But the Soviets? We could only wish for it. Although we well realize that could not have been as they are depicted: noble, faultless and helpful."

References

External links
 
 Five Days, Five Nights on ostfilm.de
 Five Days, Five Nights on defa-sternstunden.de
 Five Days, Five Nights on cinema.de
 Five Days, Five Nights on DEFA Film Library web site

1961 films
East German films
1960s Russian-language films
1960s German-language films
Films directed by Lev Arnshtam
Films scored by Dmitri Shostakovich
Mosfilm films
Art and cultural repatriation after World War II
Films set in Dresden
1960s multilingual films
German multilingual films
Soviet multilingual films